First Crush may refer to:

 "First Crush", an episode of Drake & Josh
 "First Crush", a song from the album So Uncool by Keke Palmer

See also 
 His First Crush, an album by The Bled
 First Big Crush, a book by Eric Arnold